Patrick McGrath may refer to:

Patrick McGrath (novelist) (born 1950), British novelist
Patrick Joseph McGrath (born 1945), Roman Catholic bishop to the Diocese of San Jose, CA
Patrick McGrath (psychologist) (born 1948), Canadian psychologist
Patrick McGrath (Irish politician) (died 1956), Irish Fianna Fáil politician
Patrick W. McGrath (died 2001), Irish Fine Gael politician
Patrick McGrath (Irish republican) (1894–1940)
Sir Patrick Thomas McGrath (1868–1929), Newfoundland politician
Patrick Rory McGrath (born 1956), British comedian, television personality, and writer

See also
Pat McGrath (disambiguation)